Pomona High School may refer to one of the following:

Former Pomona High School, Greensboro, North Carolina
Pomona Catholic High School, Pomona, California
Pomona High School (Pomona, California), Pomona, California
Pomona High School (Arvada, Colorado), Arvada, Colorado
Pomona High School (Pomona, Kansas), Pomona, Kansas
Noosa District State High School, Pomona, Queensland, Australia